Darlington Football Club, an English association football club based in Darlington, County Durham, was founded in 1883. For their first six years, there was no league football, so matches were arranged on an occasional basis, supplemented by cup competitions organised at both local and national level. In 1889, Darlington joined the newly formed Northern League, and moved into the North-Eastern League in 1908. They were founder members of the Football League Third Division North in 1921, and spent two seasons in the Second Division in the mid-1920s. Thereafter, they remained in the lower divisions of the Football League until 1989, when they were relegated for one season to the Football Conference. After another 20 years in the Football League, they were again relegated to the Conference. Two years later, financial issues stemming from administration forced a demotion of four divisions and a change of name: Darlington 1883 was chosen. Five years later, after three promotions, they reverted to their original name.

Darlington's record against each club faced in first-team league competition is summarised below. The opening match of the inaugural Northern League season pitted them against Newcastle East End, their first Football League match was against Halifax Town, and they met their 255th and most recent different league opponent, Peterborough Sports, for the first time in the 2022–23 National League North season. The team that Darlington have played most in league competition is Hartlepool United, whom they first met in 1908 in the North-Eastern League. The 152 encounters between the teams have produced 59 wins and 62 defeats, which are club records. Rochdale have drawn 38 league meetings with Darlington, which is more than any other opponent.

All statistics are correct up to and including the match played against Hereford on 18 March 2023.

Key
The table includes results of matches played by Darlington (under that name and as Darlington 1883) in the Northern League, the North-Eastern League, the Football League, the National League and predecessors, and the Northern Premier League. Matches from the abandoned 1939–40 Football League season are excluded, as are promotion play-offs and matches in the various wartime competitions.
The name used for each opponent is the name they had when Darlington most recently played a league match against them. Results against each opponent include results against that club under any former name. For example, results against Leyton Orient include matches played against Orient (1966–1987) and Clapton Orient (before 1945).
The columns headed "First" and "Last" contain the first and most recent seasons in which Darlington played league matches against each opponent.
P = matches played; W = matches won; D = matches drawn; L = matches lost; Win % = percentage of total matches won
  Clubs with this background and symbol in the "Opponent" column are Darlington's divisional rivals in the current season, the 2020–21 National League North.
  Clubs with this background and symbol in the "Opponent" column are defunct. Reserve or "A" teams that Darlington faced in the early years of their history are classed as defunct because they no longer compete in the English football league system.

All-time league record

Footnotes

References
General
 For Northern League 1889–90 to 1907–08: .
 For North-Eastern League: .
 For Football League 1921–22 to 1999–2000: .
 For Football Conference 1989–90: .
 For Football League 2000–01 to 2009–10 and Football Conference 2010–11 to 2011–12: 
 For Northern League 2012–13: 
 For Northern Premier League:
 
 
 
 For National League North 2016–17 onwards: 
 
Specific

Sources
 
 

League record by opponent
Darlington
League record by opponent